This is a list of wars involving the Republic of Somaliland and its predecessors.

Dervish State (1899–1920)

British Somaliland (1884–1960)

SNM

Somaliland

See also
List of conflicts in Somaliland

References

 
Somaliland
Wars